Left Anti-capitalist Group (Greek: Αριστερή Aντικαπιταλιστική Συσπείρωση (ΑΡ.Α.Σ.), Aristeri Antikapitalistiki Syspeirosi, ARAS) is an organisation of anti-capitalist left in Greece. In the 2007 Greek legislative it participated in the United Anti-Capitalist Left electoral coalition. In 2015, it joined the Popular Unity for the September 2015 election.

See also
Politics of Greece
List of political parties in Greece

External links
ARAS official page

Anti-capitalist organizations